The siege of Jerusalem of 70 CE was the decisive event of the First Jewish–Roman War (66–73 CE), in which the Roman army led by future emperor Titus besieged Jerusalem, the center of Jewish rebel resistance in the Roman province of Judaea. Following a brutal five-month siege, the Romans destroyed the city and the Second Jewish Temple.

In April 70 CE, three days before Passover, the Roman army started besieging Jerusalem. The city had been taken over by several rebel factions following a period of massive unrest and the collapse of a short-lived provisional government. Within three weeks, the Roman army broke the first two walls of the city, but a stubborn rebel standoff prevented them from penetrating the thickest and third wall. According to Josephus, a contemporary historian and the main source for the war, the city was ravaged by murder, famine and cannibalism.

On Tisha B'Av, 70 CE (August 30), Roman forces finally overwhelmed the defenders and set fire to the Temple. Resistance continued for another month, but eventually the upper and lower parts of the city were taken as well, and the city was burned to the ground. Titus spared only the three towers of the Herodian citadel as a testimony to the city's former might. Josephus wrote that over a million people perished in the siege and the subsequent fighting. While contemporary studies dispute this figure, all agree that the siege had a major toll on human life, with many people being killed and enslaved, and large parts of the city destroyed. This victory gave the Flavian dynasty legitimacy to claim control over the empire. A triumph was held in Rome to celebrate the fall of Jerusalem, and two triumphal arches were built to commemorate it. The treasures looted from the Temple were put on display.

The destruction of Jerusalem and the Second Temple marked a major turning point in Jewish history. The loss of mother-city and temple necessitated a reshaping of Jewish culture to ensure its survival. Judaism's Temple-based sects, including the priesthood and the Sadducees, diminished in importance. A new form of Judaism that became known as Rabbinic Judaism developed out of Pharisaic school and eventually became the mainstream form of the religion. Many followers of Jesus of Nazareth also survived the city's destruction. They spread his teachings across the Roman Empire, giving rise to the new religion of Christianity. After the war had ended, a military camp of Legio X Fretensis was established on the city's ruins. Jerusalem was later re-founded as the Roman colony of Aelia Capitolina. Foreign cults were introduced and Jews were forbidden entry. This event is often considered one of the catalysts for the Bar Kokhba revolt.

Background 

During the Second Temple Period, Jerusalem was the center of religious and national life for Jews, including those in the Diaspora. The Second Temple attracted tens and maybe hundreds of thousands during the Three Pilgrimage Festivals. The city reached a peak in size and population during the late Second Temple period, when the city covered  and had an estimated population of 200,000. In his Natural History, Pliny the Elder celebrated it as "by far, the most famous of the cities of the East".

In the early Roman period, Jerusalem had two distinct precincts. The first encompassed the regions within the "first wall", the City of David and the Upper City, and was heavily built up, though less so at its wealthy parts. The second, known as the "suburb" or "Bethesda", lay north of the first and was sparsely populated. It contained that section of Jerusalem within the Herodian "second wall" (which was still standing), though it was itself surrounded by the new "third wall", built by king Agrippa I. Josephus stated that Agrippa wanted to build a wall at least 5 meters thick, literally impenetrable by contemporary siege engines. Agrippa, however, never moved beyond the foundations, out of fear of emperor Claudius "lest he should suspect that so strong a wall was built in order to make some innovation in public affairs." It was only completed later, to a lesser strength and in much haste, when the First Jewish–Roman War broke out and the defenses of Jerusalem had to be bolstered. Nine towers adorned the third wall.

Outbreak of rebellion 
The First Jewish–Roman War, also known as the Great Jewish Revolt, broke following the appointment of prefect Gessius Florus and his demand to receive Temple funds. Nero entrusted the job of crushing the rebellion in Judaea to Vespasian, a talented and unassuming general. In early 68 CE, Roman General Vespasian landed at Ptolemais and began suppression of the revolt with operations in the Galilee. By July 69 all of Judea but Jerusalem had been pacified and the city, now hosting rebel leaders from all over the country, came under Roman siege. A fortified stronghold, it may have held for a significant amount of time, if not for the intense civil war that then broke out between moderates and Zealots. In the summer of 69 CE, Vespasian departed Judea for Rome and in December became Emperor, with command of the Roman legions passing to his son Titus.

Siege

Josephus places the siege in the second year of Vespasian, which corresponds to year 70 of the Common Era. Titus began his siege a few days before Passover, on 14 Xanthicus (April), surrounding the city with three legions (V Macedonica, XII Fulminata, XV Apollinaris) on the western side and a fourth (X Fretensis) on the Mount of Olives, to the east. If the reference in his Jewish War at 6:421 is to Titus's siege, though difficulties exist with its interpretation, then at the time, according to Josephus, Jerusalem was thronged with many people who had come to celebrate Passover.

The thrust of the siege began in the west at the Third Wall, north of the Jaffa Gate. By May, this was breached and the Second Wall also was taken shortly afterwards, leaving the defenders in possession of the Temple and the upper and lower city.

The Jewish defenders were split into factions. Simon Bar Giora and John of Giscala, the two prominent Zealot leaders, placed all blame for the failure of the revolt on the shoulders of the moderate leadership. John of Gischala's group murdered another faction leader, Eleazar ben Simon, whose men were entrenched in the forecourts of the Temple. The Zealots resolved to prevent the city from falling into Roman hands by all means necessary, including the murder of political opponents and anyone standing in their way. There were still those wishing to negotiate with the Romans and bring a peaceful end to the siege. The most prominent of these was Yohanan ben Zakkai, whose students smuggled him out of the city in a coffin in order to deal with Vespasian. This, however, was insufficient to deal with the madness that had now gripped the Zealot leadership in Jerusalem and the reign of terror it unleashed upon the population of the city. Josephus describes various acts of savagery committed against the people by its own leadership, including the torching of the city's food supply in an apparent bid to force the defenders to fight for their lives.

The enmities between John of Gischala and Simon bar Giora were papered over only when the Roman siege engineers began to erect ramparts. Titus then had a wall built to girdle the city in order to starve out the population more effectively. After several failed attempts to breach or scale the walls of the Fortress of Antonia, the Romans finally launched a secret attack. Despite early successes in repelling the Roman sieges, the Zealots fought amongst themselves, and they lacked proper leadership, resulting in poor discipline, training, and preparation for the battles that were to follow. At one point they destroyed the food stocks in the city, a drastic measure thought to have been undertaken perhaps in order to enlist a merciful God's intervention on behalf of the besieged Jews, or as a stratagem to make the defenders more desperate, supposing that was necessary in order to repel the Roman army.

According to Josephus, when the Romans reached Antonia they tried to destroy the wall which protected it. They removed four stones only, but during the night the wall collapsed. "That night the wall was so shaken by the battering rams in that place where John had used his stratagem before, and had undermined their banks, that the ground then gave way, and the wall fell down suddenly." (v. 28)
 Following this, Titus had raised banks beside the court of the Temple: on the north-west corner, on the north side, and on the west side (v. 150).

Josephus goes on to say that the Jews then attacked the Romans on the east, near the Mount of Olives, but Titus drove them back to the valley. Zealots set the north-west colonnade on fire (v. 165). The Romans set the next one on fire, and the Jews wanted it to burn (v. 166), and they also trapped some Roman soldiers when they wanted to climb over the wall. They had burned wood under the wall when Romans were trapped on it (v.178–183).

After Jewish allies killed a number of Roman soldiers, Josephus claims that Titus sent him to negotiate with the defenders; this ended with Jews wounding the negotiator with an arrow, and another sally was launched shortly after. Titus was almost captured during this sudden attack, but escaped.

Overlooking the Temple compound, the fortress provided a perfect point from which to attack the Temple itself. Battering rams made little progress, but the fighting itself eventually set the walls on fire; a Roman soldier threw a burning stick onto one of the Temple's walls. Destroying the Temple was not among Titus's goals, possibly due in large part to the massive expansions done by Herod the Great mere decades earlier. Titus had wanted to seize it and transform it into a temple dedicated to the Roman Emperor and the Roman pantheon. However, the fire spread quickly and was soon out of control. The Temple was captured and destroyed on 9/10 Tisha B'Av, sometime in August 70 CE, and the flames spread into the residential sections of the city. Josephus described the scene:

As the legions charged in, neither persuasion nor threat could check their impetuosity: passion alone was in command. Crowded together around the entrances many were trampled by their friends, many fell among the still hot and smoking ruins of the colonnades and died as miserably as the defeated. As they neared the Sanctuary they pretended not even to hear Caesar's commands and urged the men in front to throw in more firebrands. The partisans were no longer in a position to help; everywhere was slaughter and flight. Most of the victims were peaceful citizens, weak and unarmed, butchered wherever they were caught. Round the Altar the heaps of corpses grew higher and higher, while down the Sanctuary steps poured a river of blood and the bodies of those killed at the top slithered to the bottom.Josephus's account absolves Titus of any culpability for the destruction of the Temple, but this may merely reflect his desire to procure favor with the Flavian dynasty.

The Roman legions quickly crushed the remaining Jewish resistance. Some of the remaining Jews escaped through hidden tunnels and sewers, while others made a final stand in the Upper City. This defense halted the Roman advance as they had to construct siege towers to assail the remaining Jews. Herod's Palace fell on 7 September, and the city was completely under Roman control by 8 September. The Romans continued to pursue those who had fled the city.

Destruction
The account of Josephus described Titus as moderate in his approach and, after conferring with others, ordering that the 500-year-old Temple be spared. According to Josephus, it was the Jews who first used fire in the Northwest approach to the Temple to try and stop Roman advances. Only then did Roman soldiers set fire to an apartment adjacent to the Temple, starting a conflagration which the Jews subsequently made worse.

Josephus had acted as a mediator for the Romans and, when negotiations failed, witnessed the siege and aftermath. He wrote:
Now as soon as the army had no more people to slay or to plunder, because there remained none to be the objects of their fury (for they would not have spared any, had there remained any other work to be done), [Titus] Caesar gave orders that they should now demolish the entire city and Temple, but should leave as many of the towers standing as they were of the greatest eminence; that is, Phasaelus, and Hippicus, and Mariamne; and so much of the wall enclosed the city on the west side. This wall was spared, in order to afford a camp for such as were to lie in garrison [in the Upper City], as were the towers [the three forts] also spared, in order to demonstrate to posterity what kind of city it was, and how well fortified, which the Roman valor had subdued; but for all the rest of the wall [surrounding Jerusalem], it was so thoroughly laid even with the ground by those that dug it up to the foundation, that there was left nothing to make those that came thither believe it [Jerusalem] had ever been inhabited. This was the end which Jerusalem came to by the madness of those that were for innovations; a city otherwise of great magnificence, and of mighty fame among all mankind.
And truly, the very view itself was a melancholy thing; for those places which were adorned with trees and pleasant gardens, were now become desolate country every way, and its trees were all cut down. Nor could any foreigner that had formerly seen Judaea and the most beautiful suburbs of the city, and now saw it as a desert, but lament and mourn sadly at so great a change. For the war had laid all signs of beauty quite waste. Nor had anyone who had known the place before, had come on a sudden to it now, would he have known it again. But though he [a foreigner] were at the city itself, yet would he have inquired for it.

Archeological evidence 

Over the years, various remains that provide evidence of Jerusalem's destruction have been discovered, leading scholars to believe that Josephus' description is accurate. Ronny Reich wrote that "While remains relating to the destruction of the Temple are scant, those pertaining to the Temple Mount walls and their close vicinity, the Upper City, the western part of the city, and the Tyropoeon Valley are considerable. [...] It was found that in most cases the archaeological record coincides with the historical description, pointing to Josephus' reliability".

In the 1970s and 1980s, a team led by Nahman Avigad discovered traces of great fire that damaged the Upper City's residential buildings. The fires consumed all organic matter. In houses where there was a beamed ceiling between the floors, the fire caused the top of the building to collapse with the top rows of stone, along with the top rows of stone, and they buried everything that remained in the home under them. There are buildings where traces remain only in part of the house, and there are buildings that have been completely burned. Calcium oxides have been discovered in several locations, indicating that a lengthy burning damaged the limestones. The Burnt House in the Herodian Quarter, for example, shows signs of a fire that raged at the site during the city's destruction.

The fire left its mark even on household utensils and objects that were in the same buildings. Limestone vessels were stained with ash or even burned and turned into lime, glass vessels exploded and warped from the heat of the fire until they could not be recovered in the laboratory. In contrast, pottery and basalt survived. The layer of ash and charred wood left over from the fires reached a height of about an average meter, and the rock falls reached up to two meters and more.The great urban drainage channel and the Pool of Siloam in the Lower City silted up and stopped working, and the city walls collapsed in numerous places.

Massive stone collapses from the Temple Mount's walls were discovered laying over the Herodian street that runs along the Western Wall. Among these stones is the Trumpeting Place inscription, a monumental Hebrew inscription which was thrown down by Roman legionnaires during the destruction of the Temple.

Massacre, enslavement and displacement 
Jerusalem was completely destroyed at the end of the siege; it is improbable that many Jews survived in Jerusalem or the surrounding area. Before and during the siege, according to Josephus, there were multiple waves of desertions from the city.

Josephus wrote that 1.1 million people were killed during the siege, of which a majority were Jewish. Josephus attributes this to the celebration of Passover which he uses as rationale for the vast number of people present among the death toll. The revolt had not deterred pilgrims from Jewish diaspora communities from trekking to Jerusalem to visit the Temple during the holiday, and a large number became trapped in the city and perished during the siege. Armed rebels, as well as the frail citizens, were put to death. All of Jerusalem's remaining citizens became Roman prisoners. After the Romans killed the armed and elder people, 97,000 were enslaved. Of the 97,000, thousands were forced to become gladiators and eventually expired in the arena. Many others were forced to assist in the building of the Forum of Peace and the Colosseum. Those under 17 years of age were sold into servitude.

Josephus' death toll assumptions were rejected as impossible by Seth Schwartz, as according to his estimates at that time about a million people lived in Palestine, about half of whom were Jews, and sizable Jewish populations remained in the area after the war was over, even in the hard-hit region of Judea. Schwartz, however, believes that the captive number of 97,000 is more reliable.

Roman historian Tacitus writes that: "[...] the total number of the besieged of every age and both sexes was six hundred thousand; there were arms for all who could use them, and the number ready to fight was larger than could have been anticipated from the total population. Both men and women showed the same determination; and if they were to be forced to change their home, they feared life more than death".

Triumph 
Titus and his soldiers celebrated victory upon their return to Rome by parading the Menorah and Table of the Bread of God's Presence through the streets. Up until this parading, these items had only ever been seen by the High Priest of the Temple. This event was memorialized in the Arch of Titus.

Some 700 Judean prisoners were paraded through the streets of Rome in chains during the triumph, among them Simon bar Giora and John of Giscala. Simon bar Giora was executed by being thrown to his death from the Tarpeian Rock at the Temple of Jupiter after being judged a rebel and a traitor, while John of Giscala was sentenced to life imprisonment.

According to Philostratus, writing in the early years of the 3rd century, Titus reportedly refused to accept a wreath of victory, saying that the victory did not come through his own efforts but that he had merely served as an instrument of divine wrath.

Aftermath

Suppression of the revolt 

After the fall of Jerusalem and the destruction of the city and its temple, there were still a few Judean strongholds in which the rebels continued holding out, at Herodium, Machaerus, and Masada. Both Herodium and Machaerus fell to the Roman army within the next two years, with Masada remaining as the final stronghold of the Judean rebels. In 73 CE, the Romans breached the walls of Masada and captured the fortress, with Josephus claiming that nearly all of the Jewish defenders had committed mass suicide prior to the entry of the Romans. With the fall of Masada, the First Jewish–Roman War came to an end.

Bar Kokhba revolt 

Six decades after the suppression of the revolt, another revolt known as the Bar Kokhba revolt erupted in Judaea in 132 CE. The construction of a roman colony named Aelia Capitolina over the ruins of Jerusalem and the construction of a temple to Jupiter on the Temple Mount, among other things, are thought to have been major catalysts for the revolt.

Supported by the Sanhedrin, Simon Bar Kosiba (later known as Bar Kokhba) established a short-lived independent state that was conquered by the Romans in 135 CE. The revolt resulted in the extensive depopulation of Judean communities, more so than during the First Jewish–Roman War. The Jewish communities of Judea were devastated to an extent which some scholars describe as a genocide. However, the Jewish population remained strong in other parts of Palestine, thriving in Galilee, Golan, Bet Shean Valley, and the eastern, southern, and western edges of Judea. Emperor Hadrian wiped the name Judaea off the map and replaced it with Syria Palaestina.

In later Jewish and Christian thought 
The Jewish Amoraim attributed the destruction of the Temple and Jerusalem as punishment from God for the "baseless" hatred that pervaded Jewish society at the time. Many Jews in despair are thought to have abandoned Judaism for some version of paganism, many others sided with the growing Christian sect within Judaism.

The destruction was an important point in the separation of Christianity from its Jewish roots: many Christians responded by distancing themselves from the rest of Judaism, as reflected in the Gospels, which portray Jesus as anti-Temple and view the destruction of the temple as punishment for rejection of Jesus.

Jerusalem retained its importance in Jewish life and culture even after its destruction, and it became a symbol of hope for return, rebuilding and renewal of national life. The belief in a Third Temple remains a cornerstone of Orthodox Judaism. This belief is embedded in Orthodox Jewish prayer services. Three times a day, Orthodox Jews recite the Amidah, which contains prayers for the Temple's restoration and for the resumption of sacrifices, and every day there is a recitation of the order of the day's sacrifices and the psalms the Levites would have sung that day.

Commemoration

Monuments 
The Flavian dynasty celebrated the fall of Jerusalem by building two monumental triumphal arches. The Arch of Titus, which stills stands today, was built  82 CE by the Roman Emperor Domitian on Via Sacra, Rome, to commemorate the siege and fall of Jerusalem. The bas-relief on the arch depicts soldiers carrying spoils from the Temple, including the Menorah, during a victory procession. A second, less known Arch of Titus constructed at the southeast entrance to the Circus Maximus was built by the Senate in 82 CE. Only a few traces of it remain today.

In 75 CE, the Temple of Peace, also known as the Forum of Vespasian, was built under Emperor Vespasian in Rome. The monument was built to celebrate the conquest of Jerusalem and it is said to have housed the Temple Menorah from Herod's Temple.

The Colosseum, otherwise known as the Flavian Amphitheater, built in Rome between 70 and 82 CE, is believed to have been partially financed by the spoils of the Roman victory over the Jews. Archaeological discoveries have found a block of travertine that bears dowel holes that show the Jewish Wars financed the building of the amphitheater.

Coinage 
 Judaea Capta coinage: Judaea Capta coins were a series of commemorative coins originally issued by Vespasian to celebrate the capture of Judaea and the destruction of the Temple by his son Titus.

Jewish commemoration 
 Tisha B'Av, an annual fast day in Judaism, marks the destruction of the First and Second Temples, which according to Jewish tradition, occurred on the same day on the Hebrew calendar.

Culture
The siege and destruction of Jerusalem has inspired writers and artists through the centuries.

Art 
 The Franks Casket (8th century). The back side of the casket depicts the siege.
 The Destruction of the Temple at Jerusalem by Nicolas Poussin (1637). Oil on canvas, 147 × 198.5 cm. Kunsthistorisches Museum, Vienna. Depicts the destruction and looting of the Second Temple by the Roman army led by Titus.
 The Destruction of Jerusalem by Titus by Wilhelm von Kaulbach (1846). Oil on canvas, 585 × 705 cm. Neue Pinakothek, Munich. An allegorical depiction of the destruction of Jerusalem, dramatically centered on the figure of the High Priest, with Titus entering from the right.
 The Siege and Destruction of Jerusalem by the Romans Under the Command of Titus, 70 by David Roberts (1850). Oil on canvas, 136 × 197 cm. Private collection. Depicts the burning and looting of Jerusalem by the Roman army under Titus.
 The Destruction of the Temple of Jerusalem by Francesco Hayez (1867). Oil on canvas, 183 × 252 cm. Gallerie dell'Accademia, Venice. Depicts the destruction and looting of the Second Temple by the Roman army.

Literature 
 Siege of Jerusalem, a Middle English poem (c. 1370–1390).
 The Great Jewish Revolt, book series by James Mace (2014–2016).
 The Lost Wisdom of the Magi, book by Susie Helme (2020).
 Rebel Daughter, book by Lori Banov Kaufmann (2021).

Film 
 Legend of Destruction (2021), an Israeli animated historical drama film.

See also

 Council of Jamnia
 Fiscus Judaicus
 Flight to Pella
 Herod's Temple
 Holyland Model of Jerusalem
 Jesus ben Ananias
 Kamsa and Bar Kamsa
 Preterism

References

External links

 The Temple Mount and Fort Antonia
 Map of the siege of Jerusalem 

 
1st-century battles
70
70s conflicts
70s in the Roman Empire
Flavian military campaigns
First Jewish–Roman War
Jews and Judaism in the Roman Empire
Judea (Roman province)
Second Temple
Jerusalem 70
0070
Tisha B'Av
Titus